Edmílson Matias (born 26 March 1974) is a Brazilian former footballer.

Biography
In 2006, he joined Guarani, where he participated at Campeonato Paulista, Copa do Brasil 2006 and Campeonato Brasileiro Série B 2006

In 2007, he signed a 1-year contract with Coritiba, which he played at Campeonato Paranaense and Campeonato Brasileiro Série B 2007.

In 2008, he signed for Ituano at Campeonato Paulista 2008. In 2009, he moved to Andradas for Rio Branco at Campeonato Mineiro. In 2010, he joined Campeonato Paulista newcomer Monte Azul.

Club statistics

Honours
Campeonato Brasileiro Série B: 2007
Copa do Brasil: 2004

References

External links

Profile at Sambafoot 
Profile at globo.com  
CBF 

Brazilian footballers
Brazilian expatriate footballers
União Bandeirante Futebol Clube players
Kyoto Sanga FC players
Sociedade Esportiva Palmeiras players
Esporte Clube Vitória players
Yokohama F. Marinos players
Cruzeiro Esporte Clube players
Coritiba Foot Ball Club players
Esporte Clube Juventude players
Figueirense FC players
Esporte Clube Santo André players
Associação Portuguesa de Desportos players
Goiás Esporte Clube players
Guarani FC players
Ituano FC players
Atlético Monte Azul players
Rio Branco Sport Club players
J1 League players
Japan Football League (1992–1998) players
Expatriate footballers in Japan
Expatriate footballers in Saudi Arabia
Association football forwards
Brazilian expatriate sportspeople in Japan
Sportspeople from Paraná (state)
Brazilian expatriate sportspeople in Saudi Arabia
1974 births
Living people